O'Halloran  is the surname of the ultimate and at least two distinct Gaelic-Irish families, one in County Galway and another in south-east County Clare linked to the Dál gCais. On occasions it is translated as "stranger" or "from across the sea".  The name states that this family were "importers" and were the lords, and dominant sept of Clan Fergail (Clann Fhearghaile).

In the twelfth century the O'Hallorans were chiefs of twenty-four town lands of the túath of Clan Fergail. These lay east to the river of Galmith (or "Galway"). In the 13th century the O'Hallorans were dispossessed of their ancient inheritance of Clan Fergail by the "De Burgos" (Burke) invaders. The O'Hallorans and the O'Flahertys were obliged to emigrate to Iar (west) Connaught, where they built the castle of O'Hery.

The motto of the Galway family is Clann Fearghaile Abú, which comes from their dynastic name.

Name Variations include: O'Halleron, O'Hollearn, Halloran, Holloran, Hollern, Haloran, and in Gaelic, Ó hAllmhuráin or  Ó hAlluráin)

People
Barry O'Halloran, Irish journalist
Brian O'Halloran, American actor
David O'Halloran, Australian Rules footballer
Dustin O'Halloran, American pianist and composer
Greg O'Halloran, Irish footballer
Hal O'Halloran, American radio announcer and singer
Jack O'Halloran, American boxer and actor
James O'Halloran, Canadian lawyer and politician
Joseph O'Halloran, (1763–1843), major-general in the East India Company
Kay O'Halloran, Australian-born academic
Keith O'Halloran, Irish footballer
Kevin O'Halloran (1937–1976), Australian swimmer
Kevin O'Halloran (footballer) (1915–1976), Australian Rules footballer
Mark O'Halloran (rugby league), Australian Rugby League player
Mark O'Halloran (writer), Irish actor and screenwriter
Martin O'Halloran (fl. 1879–1881), member County Galway Land League
Michael O'Halloran (disambiguation), several people, including
Michael O'Halloran (UK politician), English politician
Michael O'Halloran (footballer), Scottish footballer
Mick O'Halloran (1893–1960), South Australian politician
Sharyn O'Halloran, Professor of Political Economics at Columbia University
Stephen O'Halloran (born 1987), (soccer) footballer with Stalybridge Celtic
Sylvester O'Halloran (1728–1807), Irish doctor
Thomas O'Halloran (disambiguation), several people, including:
Thomas O'Halloran (Australian footballer) (1904–1956), Australian rules (VFL) footballer playing for Richmond
Thomas Shuldham O'Halloran (1797–1870), South Australian police commissioner
Thomas Joseph Shuldham O'Halloran (1835–1922), his son, magistrate and minor football identity
Thomas Shuldham O'Halloran (lawyer) (1865–1945), his grandson, SAFL football official
Tom O'Halloran (Australian footballer) (1892–1970), Australian rules (VFL) footballer with South Melbourne
Tom O'Halloran (climber) (born 1992), Australian professional rock climber
William O'Halloran (trade unionist) (born 1870), trade union pioneer in Galway, Ireland
William O'Halloran (cricketer) (1934–1994), Australian cricketer
William Littlejohn O'Halloran (1806–1885), British Army officer and public servant in South Australia

Places
O'Halloran Hill, South Australia
Halloran Springs, California, a US community in the Mojave Desert

See also
Tom O'Halleran (born 1946), American politician
Crichaireacht cinedach nduchasa Muintiri Murchada
Halloran (disambiguation)

References

Surnames
Irish families
Surnames of Irish origin
Anglicised Irish-language surnames